Fighting Back is a 1948 American drama film directed by Malcolm St. Clair and written by John Stone. The film stars Paul Langton, Jean Rogers, Gary Gray, Joe Sawyer, Morris Ankrum and John Kellogg. The film was released on July 30, 1948, by 20th Century Fox.

Plot

Nick Sanders comes home from the war and needs a job. His wife June has set up an interview with her boss, Higby, who runs a textile mill. Nick makes his potential employer aware that he was in prison previously, serving two extra years in the military to get his record cleared.

The men get along because their sons are already friends. Mrs. Higby is uncomfortable with this arrangement, however. Nick not only works for Higby but also coaches the boys' baseball team. Larry has a physical condition that makes it difficult to participate, but Nick makes sure that he does so.

A bracelet belonging to Mrs. Higby is stolen, and Nick is accused. An old acquaintance, Sam Lang, is responsible, as is a cute but mischievous dog, but Sgt. Scudder of the police is suspicious of Nick until the mystery is cleared up just in time.

Cast   
Paul Langton as Nick Sanders
Jean Rogers as June Sanders
Gary Gray as Jimmy Sanders
Joe Sawyer as Police Sergeant Scudder 
Morris Ankrum as Robert J. Higby
John Kellogg as Sam Lang
Dorothy Christy as Martha Higby
Tommy Ivo as Larry Higby
Lelah Tyler as Mrs. Winkle
Pierre Watkin as Colonel

References

External links 
 

1948 films
1940s English-language films
20th Century Fox films
American drama films
1948 drama films
Films directed by Malcolm St. Clair
American black-and-white films
1940s American films